Mabea may refer to:

 Mabea (plant) a genus of the spurge family (Euphorbiaceae) of flowering plants;
 Mabea ethnic groups of Cameroon